Graphium stratiotes is a butterfly found in Borneo that belongs to the swallowtail family.

Subspecies
 G. s. stratiotes
 G. s. sukirmani

References

External links
External images of holotype

stratiotes
Butterflies described in 1887
Butterflies of Borneo
Taxa named by Henley Grose-Smith